Executive Order 14074 in the United States calls for altering criminal justice and policing practices. The order was signed by President Joe Biden on May 25, 2022. It begins by explaining the intentions of this order, "public trust" and fair policing.  It stresses the necessity of trust and fair policing, particularly in black and brown communities (since there is frequently conflict with the police in these communities).

The provisions include attempting to restrict No Knock warrants to being less frequent, and attempting to "strengthen officer recruitment, hiring, promotion, and retention practices".  The order requires federal agencies to ban chokeholds and other tactics and encourages training for de-escalation techniques via federal grants.    The bill also creates a national registry of officer misconduct.  It was signed on the second anniversary of the murder of George Floyd in Minneapolis.

Links 
 wikisource:Executive Order 14074
 Whitehouse.gov
 Executive Order on Advancing Effective, Accountable Policing and Criminal Justice Practices to Enhance Public Trust and Public Safety

References 

2022 in American law
Executive orders of Joe Biden
May 2022 events in the United States